Abu al-Hassan Ali al-Jaznai (who lived in the 14th century) was a Moroccan historian and author of Kitab Tarikh madinat Fas, al-maruf bi-Zahrat al-as fi bina madinat Fas or simply Zahrat al-As (The Myrtle Flower), an important source on the history of Fes in Morocco and its inhabitants.

Biography 
Ali al-Jaznai was born into the al-Jaznai family, a well known medieval Berber family, belonging to the Zenata Igzennayen (Jeznaya) tribe.

References

External links
 E. Levi-Provençal, Fondation de Fès, Fès-Alger, mars 1939 Wikimazigh - Fondation de Fès (retrieved 30 December 2013)
 Zahrat al-As, Abd al-Wahhab b. Mansur (ed.) 2nd edn. Rabat: Al-Matba'a al-Malikiyya, 1991

14th-century births
14th-century Berber people
14th-century Moroccan historians
Berber historians
Berber writers
People from Fez, Morocco
Year of death missing
Zenata